The Wooton Presbyterian Center, also known as Wooton Community Center, is a historic building on KY 80 in Wooton, Kentucky.  It was built during 1919-21 and added to the National Register of Historic Places in 1979.

The center provided medical services to the community from 1917 until 1950.  Its building, completed in 1921, is a two-and-a-half-story Shingle Style building with a recessed porch on its first floor and an enclosed sunporch on its second floor.

References

National Register of Historic Places in Leslie County, Kentucky
Community centers in Kentucky
Presbyterianism in Kentucky
1921 establishments in Kentucky
Shingle Style architecture in Kentucky
Cultural infrastructure completed in 1921